Mark Curtis may refer to:

 Mark Curtis (broadcaster) (born 1959), American TV journalist, author and political analyst
 Mark Curtis (British author), British political author
 Mark Curtis (SWP member) (born 1959), former American Socialist Worker's Party member
 Mark Curtis, ring name used by professional wrestling referee Brian Hildebrand